Lyaskovo may refer to:

 In Bulgaria (written in Cyrillic as Лясково):
 Lyaskovo, Burgas Province - a village in the Aytos municipality, Burgas Province
 Lyaskovo, Dobrich Province - a village in the Dobrichka municipality, Dobrich Province
 Lyaskovo, Kardzhali Province - a village in the Chernoochene municipality, Kardzhali Province
 Lyaskovo, Plovdiv Province - a village in the Asenovgrad municipality, Plovdiv Province
 Lyaskovo, Smolyan Province - a village in the Devin municipality, Smolyan Province
 Lyaskovo, Stara Zagora Province - a village in the Stara Zagora municipality, Stara Zagora Province

See also 
 Leskovo (disambiguation)
 Lyaskovets